Politics in Chicago through most of the 20th century was dominated by the Democratic Party. Organized crime and political corruption were persistent concerns in the city. Chicago was the political base for presidential nominees Stephen Douglas (1860), Adlai Stevenson II (1952 and 1956), and Barack Obama, who was nominated and elected in 2008.

History

19th century
In 1855, Chicago Mayor Levi Boone threw Chicago politics into the national spotlight with some dry proposals that led to the Lager Beer Riot by the wets. The 1860 Republican National Convention in Chicago nominated home-state candidate Abraham Lincoln. During the 1880s, 1890s, and early 20th century, Chicago also had an underground radical tradition with large and highly organized socialist, communist, anarchist and labor organizations. The Republicans had their own machine operations, typified by the "blonde boss" William Lorimer, who was unseated by the U.S. Senate in 1912 because of his corrupt election methods.

20th century	
The political environment in Chicago in the 1910s and 1920s let organized crime flourish to the point that many Chicago policemen earned more money from pay-offs than from the city. Before the 1930s, the Democratic Party in Chicago was divided along ethnic lines - the Irish, Polish, Italian, and other groups each controlled politics in their neighborhoods. Under the leadership of Anton Cermak, the party consolidated its ethnic bases into one large organization. With the organization behind, Cermak was able to win election as mayor of Chicago in 1931, an office he held until his assassination in 1933.

The modern era of politics was dominated by the Cook County Democratic Party and was honed by Richard J. Daley after his election in 1955. Richard M. Daley, his son, later became mayor and served from 1989 to 2011. Daley announced on September 7, 2010 that he would not be seeking re-election. Daley was succeeded by former Obama White House Chief of Staff Rahm Emanuel.

The New Deal of the 1930s and the Great Society of the 1960s gave the Democratic Party access to new funds and programs for housing, slum clearance, urban renewal, and education, through which to dispense patronage and maintain control of the city. Machine politics persisted in Chicago after the decline of similar machines in other large American cities. During much of that time, the city administration found opposition mainly from a liberal "independent" faction of the Democratic Party. This included African Americans and Latinos. In the Lakeview/Uptown 46th Ward, the first Latino to announce an aldermanic bid against a Daley loyalist was Jose Cha Cha Jimenez, founder of the Young Lords.

The police corruption that came to the light from the Summerdale Scandals of 1960, in which police officers kept stolen property or sold it and kept the cash, was another black eye on the local political scene of Chicago. Eight officers from the Summerdale police district on Chicago's Northwest Side were accused of operating a large-scale burglary ring.

The Daley faction, with financial help from Joseph P. Kennedy, Sr., helped elect John F. Kennedy to the office of President of the United States in the 1960 presidential election. 

Home-town columnist Mike Royko wrote satirically that Chicago's motto (Urbs in Horto or "City in a Garden") should instead be Ubi est mea, or "Where's Mine?"

The shock election of six Democratic Socialists of America to the council in 2019 was as the largest socialist electoral victory in modern American history.

Corruption
Chicago has a long history of political corruption, dating to the incorporation of the city in 1833. It has been a de facto monolithic entity of the Democratic Party from the mid-20th century onward. In the 1980s, the Operation Greylord investigation resulted in the indictments of 93 public officials, including 17 judges. Research released by the University of Illinois at Chicago reports that Chicago and Cook County's judicial district recorded 45 public corruption convictions for 2013, and 1,642 convictions since 1976, when the Department of Justice began compiling statistics. This prompted many media outlets to declare Chicago the "corruption capital of America". Gradel and Simpson's Corrupt Illinois (2015) provides the data behind Chicago's corrupt political culture. They found that a tabulation of federal public corruption convictions make Chicago "undoubtedly the most corrupt city in our nation", with the cost of corruption "at least" $500 million per year.

See also
 Chicago Traction Wars
 Council Wars
 Government of Chicago
 History of Chicago
 Mayoral elections in Chicago
 Rod Blagojevich corruption charges

References

Further reading

Cohen, Adam, and Elizabeth Taylor. American Pharaoh: Mayor Richard J. Daley - His Battle for Chicago and the Nation. Boston: Back Bay Books, 2001. 
David K., Fremon. Chicago politics: ward by ward. Bloomington: Indiana Univ. Press, 1988
Gradel, Thomas J. and Dick Simpson, Corrupt Illinois: Patronage, Cronyism, and Criminality (University of Illinois Press, 2015) 
Green, Paul M.. The Mayors: The Chicago Political Tradition. Carbondale: Southern Illinois University Press, 1987. 
 Jones, Gene Delon. "The Origin of the Alliance between the New Deal and the Chicago Machine" Journal of the Illinois State Historical Society 67#3 (1974), pp. 253-274 online 

 Kimble Jr., Lionel. A New Deal for Bronzeville: Housing, Employment, and Civil Rights in Black Chicago, 1935-1955 (Southern Illinois University Press, 2015). xiv, 200 pp.
Lindberg, Richard Carl. To Serve and Collect: Chicago Politics and Police Corruption from the Lager Beer Riot to the Summerdale Scandal : 1855-1960. New York: Praeger Publishers, 1991. 
Sautter, R. Craig, Edward M. Burke. Inside the Wigwam: Chicago Presidential Conventions, 1860-1996. Chicago: Loyola Press, 1996. 
Simpson, Vernon. Chicago's Politics & Society: a Selected Bibliography. DeKalb: Center for Government Studies, DeKalb, Illinois: Northern Illinois University, 1972.
Wendt, Lloyd,  Herman Kogan, and Bette Jore. Big Bill of Chicago. Evanston, Illinois: Northwestern University Press, 2005

External links
 SHANE TRITSCH, DEC. 9, 2010 Chicago Magazine "Why Is Illinois So Corrupt?"
Daniel Engber, "Why Is Chicago So Corrupt?" Slate
Essay on Chicago politics by Maureen A. Flanagan @ the Chicago Historical Society's Electronic Encyclopedia of Chicago
Machine Politics essay by Roger Biles @ the Chicago Historical Society's Electronic Encyclopedia of Chicago
"Mayor Daley is not seeking another term" by Fran Spielman, City Hall Reporter
Politics, Encyclopedia of Chicago
"Will the Next Mayor Pull Strings?" by Don Rose"

History of Chicago
Culture of Chicago
Government of Chicago
Chicago